Rally Championship is a series of loosely related rally video games, focused on rally racing and based on what is now known as the Wales Rally GB. The series began in 1988 with Europress' Lombard RAC Rally game and ended in 2002. Each game in the series had many different front covers.

Lombard RAC Rally (1988) 

In 1988, Europress released Lombard RAC Rally for the Atari ST and Amiga under their Mandarin Software label. This was based on the same rally (under the earlier sponsors' names) as the later Network Q RAC Rally games.

The game prominently featured an animated driver, seen from behind moving the steering wheel, with the road seen through the car's windscreen.

Network Q RAC Rally (1993)

Five years after Lombard RAC Rally, in 1993 Europress released Network Q RAC Rally for MS-DOS.

Network Q RAC Rally Championship (1996)

The next game in the series was called Network Q RAC Rally Championship. It was released for MS-DOS in 1996. This new version has more tracks, cars, and better graphics. An expansion pack, The X-Miles, was released in 1997. It added 10 new tracks and an arcade mode.

International Rally Championship (1997)

International Rally Championship came in November 1997, and became available for Windows and PlayStation. New features arrived, such as Track Editor and playable up to 8 players via LAN.

Mobil 1 Rally Championship (1999)

Mobil 1 Rally Championship came in December 1999, for Windows and PlayStation. The Windows version of the game has been viewed as one of the most realistic game, due to very high quality graphics for its time, unlike the unsuccessful PlayStation version.

Rally Championship Xtreme (2001)

Rally Championship Xtreme came in November 2001 for Windows. It was not really as successful as its predecessor.

Rally Championship (2002)

The sixth game of the series was called Rally Championship. It was released for PlayStation 2 and GameCube in May 2002. It was the last of the series.

References

External links
Rally Championship series at MobyGames

Rally GB
Video game franchises
Video game franchises introduced in 1988